Serbia is competing at the 2013 World Aquatics Championships in Barcelona, Spain between 19 July and 4 August 2013.

Swimming

Serbian swimmers achieved qualifying standards in the following events (up to a maximum of 2 swimmers in each event at the A-standard entry time, and 1 at the B-standard):

Men

Women

Synchronized swimming

Serbia has qualified the following synchronized swimmers.

Water polo

Men's tournament

Team roster

Milan Aleksić
Miloš Ćuk
Filip Filipović
Živko Gocić
Dušan Mandić
Branislav Mitrović
Stefan Mitrović
Slobodan Nikić
Duško Pijetlović
Gojko Pijetlović
Andrija Prlainović
Nikola Rađen
Vanja Udovičić

Group play

Round of 16

Quarterfinal

5th–8th place semifinal
 
Seventh place game

References

External links
Barcelona 2013 Official Site
Plivački Savez Srbije 

Nations at the 2013 World Aquatics Championships
2013 in Serbian sport
Serbia at the World Aquatics Championships